Palliser Furniture is a furniture manufacturing company headquartered in Winnipeg, Manitoba, Canada.

In 2018, Peter Tielmann was appointed president and CEO of Palliser Furniture.  Art DeFehr was then appointed chairman.

History
In 1944, Abram Albert DeFehr,  a Russian-born immigrant to Canada, began making wooden pieces in the basement of his Winnipeg home. Within a few years, the business moved from the basement into a former chicken barn, which became Palliser Furniture's first factory.

References

External links
  Palliser website

Manufacturing companies based in Winnipeg